A covert operation or undercover operation is a military or police operation involving a covert agent or troops acting under an assumed cover to conceal the identity of the party responsible. Some of the covert operations are also clandestine operations which are performed in secret and meant to stay secret, though many are not.

Foreign settings
Covert operations aim to fulfill their mission objectives without anyone knowing who sponsored or carried out the operation. The Department of Defense Dictionary of Military and Associated Terms (Joint Publication JP1-02), defines "covert operation" as "an operation that is so planned and executed as to conceal the identity of or permit plausible denial by the sponsor. A covert operation differs from a clandestine operation in that emphasis is placed on concealment of a sponsor rather than on concealment of the operation".

Covert operations are employed in situations where openly operating against a target would be disadvantageous. Operations may be directed at or conducted with allies and friends to secure their support for controversial components of foreign policy throughout the world. Covert operations may include sabotage, assassinations, support for coups d'état, or support for subversion. Tactics include the use of a false flag or front group. The activity of organizations engaged in covert operations is in some instances similar to or overlaps with, the activity of front organizations. While covert organizations are generally of a more official military or paramilitary nature, like the DVS German Air Transport School in the Nazi era, the line between both becomes muddled in the case of front organizations engaged in terrorist activities and organized crime.

Laws 
Under U.S. law, the Central Intelligence Agency (CIA) must lead covert operations unless the president finds that another agency should do so and properly informs Congress. Normally, the CIA is the U.S. government agency legally allowed to carry out covert action. The CIA's authority to conduct covert action comes from the National Security Act of 1947. President Ronald Reagan issued Executive Order 12333 titled United States Intelligence Activities in 1984. This order defined covert action as "special activities", both political and military, that the US Government could legally deny. The CIA was also designated as the sole authority under the 1991 Intelligence Authorization Act and in Title 50 of the United States Code Section 413(e). The CIA must have a "Presidential Finding" issued by the President of the United States in order to conduct these activities under the Hughes-Ryan amendment to the 1991 Intelligence Authorization Act. These findings are then monitored by the oversight committees in both the U.S. Senate and the House of Representatives. As a result of this framework, William J. Daugherty writes that the CIA "receives more oversight from the Congress than any other agency in the federal government". The Special Activities Division (SAD) is a division of the CIA's Directorate of Operations, responsible for Covert Action and "Special Activities". These special activities include covert political influence and paramilitary operations.

Covert vs. clandestine operations

Covert operations and clandestine operations are distinct but may overlap. A clandestine operation and its effects may go completely unnoticed. The United States Department of Defense definition has been used by the United States and NATO since World War II. In a covert operation, the identity of the sponsor is concealed, while in a clandestine operation the operation itself is concealed. Put differently, clandestine means "hidden", while covert means "deniable". The term stealth refers both to a broad set of tactics aimed at providing and preserving the element of surprise and reducing enemy resistance and to a set of technologies (stealth technology) to aid in those tactics. While secrecy and stealthiness are often desired in clandestine and covert operations, the terms secret and stealthy are not used to formally describe types of missions.

Impact 
According to a 2018 study by University of Chicago political scientist Austin Carson, covert operations may have the beneficial effect of preventing escalation of disputes into full-blown wars. He argues that keeping military operations secret can limit escalation dynamics, as well as insulate leaders from domestic pressures while simultaneously allowing them communicating their interest to the adversary in keeping a war contained. He finds that covert operations are frequently detected by other major powers.

Domestic settings
To go "undercover" (that is, to go on an undercover operation) is to avoid detection by the object of one's observation, and especially to disguise one's own identity (or use an assumed identity) for the purposes of gaining the trust of an individual or organization in order to learn or confirm confidential information, or to gain the trust of targeted individuals to gather information or evidence. Undercover operations are traditionally employed by law enforcement agencies and private investigators; those in such roles are commonly referred to as undercover agents.

History 
Law enforcement has carried out undercover work in a variety of ways throughout the course of history, but Eugène François Vidocq (1775–1857) developed the first organized (though informal) undercover program in France in the early 19th century, from the late First Empire through most of the Bourbon Restoration period of 1814 to 1830. At the end of 1811 Vidocq set up an informal plainclothes unit, the Brigade de la Sûreté ("Security Brigade"), which was later converted to a security police unit under the Prefecture of Police. The Sûreté initially had eight, then twelve, and, in 1823, twenty employees. One year later, it expanded again, to 28 secret agents. In addition, there were eight people who worked secretly for the Sûreté, but instead of a salary, they received licences for gambling halls. A major portion of Vidocq's subordinates comprised ex-criminals like himself.

Vidocq personally trained his agents, for example, in selecting the correct disguise based on the kind of job. He himself went out hunting for criminals too. His memoirs are full of stories about how he outsmarted crooks by pretending to be a beggar or an old cuckold. At one point, he even simulated his own death.

In England, the first modern police force was established in 1829 by Sir Robert Peel as the Metropolitan Police of London. From the start, the force occasionally employed plainclothes undercover detectives, but there was much public anxiety that its powers were being used for the purpose of political repression. In part due to these concerns, the 1845 official Police Orders required all undercover operations to be specifically authorized by the superintendent. It was only in 1869 that Police commissioner Edmund Henderson established a formal plainclothes detective division.

The first Special Branch of police was the Special Irish Branch, formed as a section of the Criminal Investigation Department of the MPS in London in 1883, initially to combat the bombing campaign that the Irish Republican Brotherhood had begun a few years earlier. This pioneering branch became the first to receive training in counter-terrorism techniques.

Its name was changed to Special Branch as it had its remit gradually expanded to incorporate a general role in counter terrorism, combating foreign subversion and infiltrating organized crime. Law enforcement agencies elsewhere established similar Branches.

In the United States, a similar route was taken when the New York City Police Department under police commissioner William McAdoo established the Italian Squad in 1906 to combat rampant crime and intimidation in the poor Italian neighborhoods. Various federal agencies began their own undercover programs shortly afterwards – Charles Joseph Bonaparte founded the Bureau of Investigation, the forerunner of the Federal Bureau of Investigation, in 1908.

Secret police forces in the Eastern Bloc also used undercover operatives.

Participation in criminal activities 
Undercover agents may engage in criminal activities as part of their investigation. Joh defined the term authorized criminality to describe this phenomenon, which she restricts primarily to undercover law enforcement officers, excluding confidential informants. These criminal activities are primarily used to "provide opportunities for the suspect to engage in the target crime" and to maintain or bolster their cover identity. However, these crimes must be necessary to advance the investigation otherwise they may be prosecutable like any other crime. The FBI requires that such activities must be sanctioned and necessary for the investigation; they also stipulate that agents may not instigate criminal activity (to avoid entrapment) or participate in violence except for self-defense or the defense of others. Unfortunately, most other legislation surrounding authorized criminality is not uniform and is a patchwork of federal and state laws.

Risks 
There are two principal problems that can affect agents working in undercover roles. The first is the maintenance of identity and the second is the reintegration back into normal duty.

Living a double life in a new environment presents many problems.  Undercover work is one of the most stressful jobs a special agent can undertake. The largest cause of stress identified is the separation of an agent from friends, family and his normal environment. This simple isolation can lead to depression and anxiety.  There is no data on the divorce rates of agents, but strain on relationships does occur.  This can be a result of a need for secrecy and an inability to share work problems, and the unpredictable work schedule, personality and lifestyle changes and the length of separation can all result in problems for relationships.

Stress can also result from an apparent lack of direction of the investigation or not knowing when it will end.  The amount of elaborate planning, risk, and expenditure can pressure an agent to succeed, which can cause considerable stress. The stress that an undercover agent faces is considerably different from his counterparts on regular duties, whose main source of stress is the administration and the bureaucracy. As the undercover agents are removed from the bureaucracy, it may result in another problem.  The lack of the usual controls of a uniform, badge, constant supervision, a fixed place of work, or (often) a set assignment could, combined with their continual contact with the organized crime, increase the likelihood for corruption.

This stress may be instrumental in the development of drug or alcohol abuse in some agents.  They are more prone to the development of an addiction as they suffer greater stress than other police, they are isolated, and drugs are often very accessible. Police, in general, have very high alcoholism rates compared to most occupational groups, and stress is cited as a likely factor. The environment that agents work in often involves a very liberal exposure to the consumption of alcohol, which in conjunction with the stress and isolation could result in alcoholism.

There can be some guilt associated with going undercover due to betraying those who have come to trust the officer. This can cause anxiety or even, in very rare cases, sympathy with those being targeted.  This is especially true with the infiltration of political groups, as often the agent will share similar characteristics with those they are infiltrating like class, age, ethnicity or religion.  This could even result in the conversion of some agents.

The lifestyle led by undercover agents is very different compared to other areas in law enforcement, and it can be quite difficult to reintegrate back into normal duties.  Agents work their own hours, they are removed from direct supervisory monitoring, and they can ignore the dress and etiquette rules. So resettling back into the normal police role requires the shedding of old habits, language and dress.  After working such free lifestyles, agents may have discipline problems or exhibit neurotic responses.  They may feel uncomfortable, and take a cynical, suspicious or even paranoid world view and feel continually on guard.
Other risks include capture, death and torture.

Plainclothes law enforcement 

Undercover agents should not be confused with law enforcement officers who wear plainclothesthat is, to wear civilian clothing, instead of wearing a uniform, to avoid detection or identification as a law enforcement officer. However, plainclothes police officers typically carry normal police equipment and normal identification. Police detectives are assigned to wear plainclothes by wearing suits or formal clothes instead of the uniform typically worn by their peers. Police officers in plainclothes must identify themselves when using their police powers; however, they are not required to identify themselves on demand and may lie about their status as a police officer in some situations (see sting operation).

Sometimes, police might drive an unmarked vehicle or a vehicle which looks like a taxi.

Controversies

Examples

 Black operations
 CIA Project Cherry
 Creation of Bangladesh
 False flag
 Huston Plan
 Iran-Contra affair
 Lavon Affair
 Military Assistance Command, Vietnam – Studies and Observations Group
 Operation Anthropoid
 Operation CHAOS
 Operation Gladio
 Operation Storm-333
 Operation Wrath of God
 Palace Dog
 Project MKULTRA
 Raven Forward Air Controllers
 Vang Pao's clandestine army

In popular culture
Covert operations have often been the subject of popular films (e.g. Infernal Affairs, Zero Dark Thirty, Argo, The Falcon and The Snowman, The Kremlin Letter), novels, TV series, and comics.

The Company is a fictional covert organization featured in the American TV series Prison Break. Also other series that deal with covert operations are Mission: Impossible, Alias, Burn Notice, The Unit, The State Within, Covert Affairs, Air Wolf, 24,  The West Wing, The Blacklist, Scandal, Strike Back series, and Vagabond.

See also 

 America Undercover, television series
 Black project
 Bob Lambert, undercover police officer
 Central Intelligence Agency
 Church Committee
 Counterintelligence
 Counterintelligence Field Activity
 Cover (intelligence gathering)
 Covert policing in the United Kingdom
 Covert Warfare
 Detective
 Donnie Brasco, undercover federal agent
 Espionage
 Federal Bureau of Investigation
 Filibuster (military)
 HUMINT (clandestine (operational techniques))
 Manhunt (military)
 MI5
 Military intelligence
 Operation Cyclone
 Paul Manning, undercover police officer
 Secret identity
 SO10
 Special agent
 Spy fiction
 Spy film
 Task Force Falcon
 Vice

References

Further reading 

 Statutory Procedures Under Which Congress Is To Be Informed of U.S. Intelligence Activities, Including Covert Actions by Alfred Cumming, 18 January 2006 (HTML) – Congressional Research Service
 
  Documentary about Mark Kennedy (policeman).
  Documentary featuring the work of ex-cop Mike Russell, whose undercover work for the New Jersey State Police led to the arrests of over 41 members of the Genovese crime family, and of corrupt prison officials and a state senator

External links
 RAW and Bangladesh
 Richard Hersh Statement to House Judiciary Democratic Congressional Briefing, 20 January 2006 (HTML) via thewall.civiblog.org
 Full Transcript, House Judiciary Democratic Membership Briefing "Constitution in Crisis: Domestic Surveillance and Executive Power" 20 January 2006 (HTML) via thewall.civiblog.org
 "Big Brother is Watching You Part 1 – 902 MI Group TALON Project Summary, Spreadsheet, Rep. Wexler response, and News Coverage collection (includes Shane Harris's "TIA Lives On") via thewall.civiblog.org
 Steath Network Operations Centre – Covert Communication Support System

Military intelligence collection
Intelligence operations by type
Covert organizations
Secrecy
 
Law enforcement terminology
Spies by role
Passing (sociology)